Bombay to Bangkok is a 2008 Indian Hindi comedy film written and directed by Nagesh Kukunoor, starring Shreyas Talpade and Lena Christensen. The film is produced by Elahe Hiptoola, and Rahul Puri.

Plot
Shankar, a chef, in desperate need of money, steals from the local don and escapes by tagging along with a team of doctors heading for relief work to Bangkok. Unfortunately, he loses the all-important money bag in the chaos.

In Bangkok, his world turns upside down at a massage parlour where he bumps into Jasmine. The hitch is, she is all Thai and he can't converse with her at all. A ray of hope comes his way the next day when Jasmine turns up desperately in need of a doctor.

Shankar, posing as a doctor along with his Sikh buddy Rachinder, jumps into this whirlpool, while Jasmine soon gets pulled into his bumbling adventures while running away from the don and his son, Jamal.

Cast 
 Shreyas Talpade as Shankar
 Lena Christensen as Jasmine
 Vijay Maurya as Jamal
 Yatin Karyekar as Yatin 
 Manmeet Singh as Rachinder Singh
 Jeneva Talwar as Dr. Rati
 Naseeruddin Shah as Don (special appearance)

Soundtrack

Reception
Sonia Chopra of Sify gave the film 3 out of 5, writing ″Bombay to Bangkok is recommended for a one-time watch for its breezy tone, a few funny moments and a stupendous performance by Talpade.″

Conversely, Khalid Mohamed of  Hindustan Times gave the film 2 out of 5, ″This could have been a fun movie if it had strived for quality. No one did. So, do yourself a favour, fly over this Kukunoor’s nest. Or weep.″ Taran Adarsh of  IndiaFM gave the film 1.5 out of 5, writing ″Shreyas is a fine actor and he proves his abilities yet again. Lena, the Thai actress, is equally competent. The actor enacting the role of Rachinder is good. Vijay Maurya is excellent. Yateen Karyekar is alright. Naseeruddin Shah is there for just one scene. On the whole, BOMBAY TO BANGKOK has a few enjoyable moments, but that's about it.″

References

External links 
 
 

2008 films
2000s Hindi-language films
2008 romantic comedy-drama films
Films set in Thailand
Films about chefs
Films about con artists
Indian romantic comedy-drama films
Medical-themed films
Films directed by Nagesh Kukunoor
2008 comedy-drama films